The 2010–11 season was Burnley's 1st season back in the second tier of English football after being relegated from the Premier League. They were managed by Brian Laws in his first full season in charge since he replaced Owen Coyle after he left to join Bolton Wanderers halfway through the 2009–10 season. Burnley finished 8th with 68 points, 7 points off the playoffs position with a goal difference of +4.

League table

Match details

Football League Championship

FA Cup

Football League Cup

Coaching staff

Transfers

In

Out

Appearances and goals
Numbers in parentheses denote appearances as substitute.
Players with names struck through and marked  left the club during the playing season.
Players with names in italics and marked * were on loan from another club for the whole of their season with Burnley.
Players listed with no appearances have been in the matchday squad but only as unused substitutes.
Key to positions: GK – Goalkeeper; DF – Defender; MF – Midfielder; FW – Forward

References

External links
 Burnley FC Official Website

2010–11 Football League Championship by team
2010-11